Ball im Savoy (Ball at the Savoy) is a jazz operetta in three acts and a prelude by Paul Abraham to a libretto by Alfred Grünwald and Fritz Löhner-Beda.

It premiered on 23 December 1932 at the Großes Schauspielhaus, Berlin. However, Hitler became Chancellor five weeks later, and because composer and librettists were all Jewish, the show was forced to close down (despite its critical and popular acclaim) on 2 April, 1933. It was revived on 9 September 1933 at the New German Theatre in Prague under music director George Szell.

The English-language premiere was on 8 September 1933 at the Drury Lane Theatre, London, under the title Ball at the Savoy, with the libretto adapted by Oscar Hammerstein. This was Abraham's last major success.

Although Ball im Savoy is a relatively recent operetta, its characters follow the classic scheme: Aristide (tenor) is a rueful rake, excruciated by the possible betrayal. Madeleine (soprano) is a more modern person, ready to give as good as she gets, albeit plagued by scruples: a feminist before the term existed, who receives approval from the other women. Mustafa represents the stock comic. More interesting is Daisy (soubrette): sly, brave, she knows what she wants and how to get it.

The music
The score is more modern than the libretto, using an abundance of foxtrots and Latin American dances like tango and pasodoble. However, it also features the waltz in its classic shape, known as the "English Waltz". Sometimes—for example in the overture—Abraham inserts some more refined harmonic development, but only in sporadic flashes. His primary aim was, as he himself declared, to search for success, one eye to Broadway theatre and the other to the cinema.

Roles
{| class="wikitable"
|+
!Role
!Voice type
!Premiere cast, 23 December 1932Conductor: Paul Abraham
|-
|Madeleine de Faublas (or Faublais)
|soprano
|Gitta Alpár
|-
|Marquis Aristide de Faublas, her husband
|tenor
|Arthur Schröder
|-
|Daisy Darlington (Parker) (José Pasodoble), jazz composer
|soprano
|Rosy Barsony
|-
|Mustapha Bey, Turkish embassy attaché
|tenor
|Oszkár Dénes
|-
|Tangolita. Argentine dancer
|contralto
|Trude Berliner
|-
|Archibald, Aristide's servant
|baritone
|
|-
|Mizzi from Vienna, divorced wife of Mustapha Bey
|spoken
|
|-
|Blanca from Prague, divorced wife of Mustapha Bey
|spoken
|
|-
|Lucia from Rome, divorced wife of Mustapha Bey
|spoken
|
|-
|Mercedes from Madrid, divorced wife of Mustapha Bey
|spoken
|
|-
|Trude from Berlin, divorced wife of Mustapha Bey
|spoken
|
|-
|Ilonka from Budapest, divorced wife of Mustapha Bey
|spoken
|
|-
|Célestin Formant, lawyer
|spoken
|Viktor de Kowa
|-
|Pomerol, headwaiter at the 'Savoy'''
|spoken
|
|-
|Monsieur Albert, head of a fashion house in Paris|spoken
|
|-
|Ernest Bennuet, a young friend of Célestin|spoken
|
|-
|Bébé, Madeleine's maid|spoken
|
|-
|colspan="3"|Guests at Faublas's, hotel guests and staff, ball guests, dancers|}

Synopsis
Place and time: Venice, Nice, Paris; 1932

PreludeVenice, palaces at the Grand Canal of VeniceAct 1Hall in a villa in NiceThe Marquis Aristide de Faublas and his wife Madeleine celebrate the return from their lengthy honeymoon in their villa in Nice, when a telegram from the dancer Tangolita arrives. In Aristide's turbulent past, he had promised her an intimate supper on a night of her choosing. Now she wants him to take her tonight to the annual Grand Ball at the Hotel Savoy. With the help of Mustafa Bey, Aristide persuades his wife that he has to go to the Savoy to meet the famous jazz musician José Pasodoble and that Madeleine can not go because the suitcase with her ball gown has not arrived. But Pasodoble is the pseudonym of Madeleine's American cousin, Daisy, so Madeleine now knows she is to be deceived.

Act 2Foyer to the Ballroom of the Savoy in ParisWhile Aristide meets his old friends from his bachelor days, Madeleine wants revenge. Hiding her face behind a veil, she flirts with Célestin Formant, a timid young man who hopes for the adventure of his life. Meanwhile, Mustafa is enchanted by Daisy.

Aristide and Tangolita withdraw for supper to a private dining room at the hotel, as do Madeleine and the courting Célestin. During dinner, Aristide asks for the telephone in order to call his wife, but the waiter Pomerol, accustomed to these situations, diverts the line to Madeleine's dining room, so that she can answer, pretending to be at home. Deeply disappointed, Madeleine decides to succumb to Célestin. While José Pasodoble receives praise from the Savoy Hotel and reveals her true identity, Madeleine announces publicly to have betrayed her husband.

Act 3Hall in a villa in NiceMadeleine's revenge receives general approval, while Aristide gets enraged in doubt: did she or did she not? Since Madeleine continues to confirm the betrayal, the Marquis calls a lawyer in order to start divorce proceedings. The lawyer arrives: it is Célestin Formant, but even from him Aristide cannot discover whether the betrayal took place. Mustafa proposes marriage to Daisy —and this time for life— but only if Aristide and Madeleine get reconciled, so Daisy reveals the truth to Aristide, and the couple gets re-united.

Notable arias
"Bist du mir treu?"
"Es ist so schön, am Abend bummeln zu geh'n"
"Tangolita"
"Toujours l'amour"
"Wenn wir Türken küssen"

Movie/TV adaptationsBall at the Savoy, a 1935 Austrian-Hungarian film adaptation directed by Steve Sekely
 Ball at Savoy, a 1936 British film adaptation directed by Victor Hanbury
 Ball at the Savoy'', a 1955 West German film adaptation directed by Paul Martin

References
A few aspects of this work are uncertain: the libretto is sometimes credited to Leo Stein and Béla Jenbach. The surname of the two main protagonists is often spelled Faublais. In non-German productions, Daisy's surname seems interchangeably Darlington or Parker; incidentally, Daisy Parker was the name of Louis Armstrong's first wife. The release year of the first movie is given as 1934 or 1935.

Further reading
Details, incl. roles 
Details, incl. instrumentation 

Operas by Paul Abraham
Operas
German-language operettas
1932 operas
Operas set in the 20th century